The 1904 VFL season was the eighth season of the Victorian Football League (VFL), the highest level senior Australian rules football competition in Victoria. The season featured eight clubs, ran from 7 May until 17 September, and comprised a 17-game home-and-away season followed by a finals series featuring the top four clubs.

The premiership was won by the Fitzroy Football Club for the third time, after it defeated  by 24 points in the 1904 VFL Grand Final.

Premiership season
In 1904, the VFL competition consisted of eight teams of 18 on-the-field players each, with no "reserves", although any of the 18 players who had left the playing field for any reason could later resume their place on the field at any time during the match.

Each team played each other twice in a home-and-away season of 14 rounds. Then, based on ladder positions after those 14 rounds, three further 'sectional rounds' were played, with the teams ranked 1st, 3rd, 5th and 7th playing in one section and the teams ranked 2nd, 4th, 6th and 8th playing in the other. 

Once the 17 round home-and-away season had finished, the 1904 VFL Premiers were determined by the specific format and conventions of the amended "Argus system".

Round 1

|- bgcolor="#CCCCFF"
| Home team
| Home team score
| Away team
| Away team score
| Venue
| Date
|- bgcolor="#FFFFFF"
| 
| 8.10 (58)
| 
| 2.5 (17)
| EMCG
| 7 May 1904
|- bgcolor="#FFFFFF"
| 
| 9.15 (69)
| 
| 7.9 (51)
| Victoria Park
| 7 May 1904
|- bgcolor="#FFFFFF"
| 
| 1.8 (14)
| 
| 16.12 (108)
| Princes Park
| 7 May 1904
|- bgcolor="#FFFFFF"
| 
| 12.13 (85)
| 
| 5.9 (39)
| Junction Oval
| 7 May 1904

Round 2

|- bgcolor="#CCCCFF"
| Home team
| Home team score
| Away team
| Away team score
| Venue
| Date
|- bgcolor="#FFFFFF"
| 
| 11.17 (83)
| 
| 5.3 (33)
| Brunswick Street Oval
| 14 May 1904
|- bgcolor="#FFFFFF"
| 
| 10.7 (67)
| 
| 5.13 (43)
| Corio Oval
| 14 May 1904
|- bgcolor="#FFFFFF"
| 
| 7.7 (49)
| 
| 7.13 (55)
| MCG
| 14 May 1904
|- bgcolor="#FFFFFF"
| 
| 1.13 (19)
| 
| 5.6 (36)
| Lake Oval
| 14 May 1904

Round 3

|- bgcolor="#CCCCFF"
| Home team
| Home team score
| Away team
| Away team score
| Venue
| Date
|- bgcolor="#FFFFFF"
| 
| 4.5 (29)
| 
| 7.13 (55)
| Victoria Park
| 21 May 1904
|- bgcolor="#FFFFFF"
| 
| 8.17 (65)
| 
| 4.8 (32)
| Princes Park
| 21 May 1904
|- bgcolor="#FFFFFF"
| 
| 3.5 (23)
| 
| 14.15 (99)
| MCG
| 21 May 1904
|- bgcolor="#FFFFFF"
| 
| 5.3 (33)
| 
| 10.9 (69)
| Junction Oval
| 21 May 1904

Round 4

|- bgcolor="#CCCCFF"
| Home team
| Home team score
| Away team
| Away team score
| Venue
| Date
|- bgcolor="#FFFFFF"
| 
| 6.4 (40)
| 
| 6.16 (52)
| Corio Oval
| 28 May 1904
|- bgcolor="#FFFFFF"
| 
| 4.9 (33)
| 
| 6.6 (42)
| Brunswick Street Oval
| 28 May 1904
|- bgcolor="#FFFFFF"
| 
| 4.7 (31)
| 
| 6.4 (40)
| Junction Oval
| 28 May 1904
|- bgcolor="#FFFFFF"
| 
| 9.17 (71)
| 
| 6.3 (39)
| SCG
| 28 May 1904

Round 5

|- bgcolor="#CCCCFF"
| Home team
| Home team score
| Away team
| Away team score
| Venue
| Date
|- bgcolor="#FFFFFF"
| 
| 6.13 (49)
| 
| 4.10 (34)
| Corio Oval
| 4 June 1904
|- bgcolor="#FFFFFF"
| 
| 6.5 (41)
| 
| 11.17 (83)
| EMCG
| 4 June 1904
|- bgcolor="#FFFFFF"
| 
| 8.16 (64)
| 
| 5.9 (39)
| Lake Oval
| 4 June 1904
|- bgcolor="#FFFFFF"
| 
| 6.12 (48)
| 
| 8.5 (53)
| Victoria Park
| 4 June 1904

Round 6

|- bgcolor="#CCCCFF"
| Home team
| Home team score
| Away team
| Away team score
| Venue
| Date
|- bgcolor="#FFFFFF"
| 
| 12.6 (78)
| 
| 6.18 (54)
| Brunswick Street Oval
| 6 June 1904
|- bgcolor="#FFFFFF"
| 
| 15.10 (100)
| 
| 9.4 (58)
| Lake Oval
| 6 June 1904
|- bgcolor="#FFFFFF"
| 
| 6.5 (41)
| 
| 6.7 (43)
| EMCG
| 6 June 1904
|- bgcolor="#FFFFFF"
| 
| 8.10 (58)
| 
| 5.5 (35)
| MCG
| 6 June 1904

Round 7

|- bgcolor="#CCCCFF"
| Home team
| Home team score
| Away team
| Away team score
| Venue
| Date
|- bgcolor="#FFFFFF"
| 
| 9.12 (66)
| 
| 15.7 (97)
| Corio Oval
| 11 June 1904
|- bgcolor="#FFFFFF"
| 
| 6.9 (45)
| 
| 5.14 (44)
| Brunswick Street Oval
| 11 June 1904
|- bgcolor="#FFFFFF"
| 
| 7.5 (47)
| 
| 7.11 (53)
| Princes Park
| 11 June 1904
|- bgcolor="#FFFFFF"
| 
| 7.7 (49)
| 
| 4.10 (34)
| Junction Oval
| 11 June 1904

Round 8

|- bgcolor="#CCCCFF"
| Home team
| Home team score
| Away team
| Away team score
| Venue
| Date
|- bgcolor="#FFFFFF"
| 
| 13.13 (91)
| 
| 4.2 (26)
| MCG
| 25 June 1904
|- bgcolor="#FFFFFF"
| 
| 10.9 (69)
| 
| 4.5 (29)
| Lake Oval
| 25 June 1904
|- bgcolor="#FFFFFF"
| 
| 4.10 (34)
| 
| 8.10 (58)
| Corio Oval
| 25 June 1904
|- bgcolor="#FFFFFF"
| 
| 8.8 (56)
| 
| 7.10 (52)
| Brunswick Street Oval
| 25 June 1904

Round 9

|- bgcolor="#CCCCFF"
| Home team
| Home team score
| Away team
| Away team score
| Venue
| Date
|- bgcolor="#FFFFFF"
| 
| 9.12 (66)
| 
| 4.4 (28)
| EMCG
| 2 July 1904
|- bgcolor="#FFFFFF"
| 
| 4.5 (29)
| 
| 8.6 (54)
| Victoria Park
| 2 July 1904
|- bgcolor="#FFFFFF"
| 
| 9.7 (61)
| 
| 5.7 (37)
| Princes Park
| 2 July 1904
|- bgcolor="#FFFFFF"
| 
| 11.12 (78)
| 
| 4.7 (31)
| Junction Oval
| 2 July 1904

Round 10

|- bgcolor="#CCCCFF"
| Home team
| Home team score
| Away team
| Away team score
| Venue
| Date
|- bgcolor="#FFFFFF"
| 
| 8.10 (58)
| 
| 5.13 (43)
| Brunswick Street Oval
| 9 July 1904
|- bgcolor="#FFFFFF"
| 
| 6.8 (44)
| 
| 6.3 (39)
| EMCG
| 9 July 1904
|- bgcolor="#FFFFFF"
| 
| 5.15 (45)
| 
| 6.6 (42)
| Lake Oval
| 9 July 1904
|- bgcolor="#FFFFFF"
| 
| 4.11 (35)
| 
| 5.5 (35)
| Corio Oval
| 9 July 1904

Round 11

|- bgcolor="#CCCCFF"
| Home team
| Home team score
| Away team
| Away team score
| Venue
| Date
|- bgcolor="#FFFFFF"
| 
| 7.13 (55)
| 
| 3.6 (24)
| Victoria Park
| 16 July 1904
|- bgcolor="#FFFFFF"
| 
| 9.7 (61)
| 
| 4.1 (25)
| Princes Park
| 16 July 1904
|- bgcolor="#FFFFFF"
| 
| 6.5 (41)
| 
| 4.15 (39)
| Lake Oval
| 16 July 1904
|- bgcolor="#FFFFFF"
| 
| 3.12 (30)
| 
| 4.11 (35)
| MCG
| 16 July 1904

Round 12

|- bgcolor="#CCCCFF"
| Home team
| Home team score
| Away team
| Away team score
| Venue
| Date
|- bgcolor="#FFFFFF"
| 
| 9.13 (67)
| 
| 11.7 (73)
| MCG
| 23 July 1904
|- bgcolor="#FFFFFF"
| 
| 6.10 (46)
| 
| 6.4 (40)
| Princes Park
| 23 July 1904
|- bgcolor="#FFFFFF"
| 
| 5.5 (35)
| 
| 7.16 (58)
| Junction Oval
| 23 July 1904
|- bgcolor="#FFFFFF"
| 
| 6.8 (44)
| 
| 3.9 (27)
| Brunswick Street Oval
| 23 July 1904

Round 13

|- bgcolor="#CCCCFF"
| Home team
| Home team score
| Away team
| Away team score
| Venue
| Date
|- bgcolor="#FFFFFF"
| 
| 6.10 (46)
| 
| 10.5 (65)
| Junction Oval
| 30 July 1904
|- bgcolor="#FFFFFF"
| 
| 5.6 (36)
| 
| 7.10 (52)
| Victoria Park
| 30 July 1904
|- bgcolor="#FFFFFF"
| 
| 6.14 (50)
| 
| 4.10 (34)
| Princes Park
| 30 July 1904
|- bgcolor="#FFFFFF"
| 
| 5.12 (42)
| 
| 4.13 (37)
| Corio Oval
| 30 July 1904

Round 14

|- bgcolor="#CCCCFF"
| Home team
| Home team score
| Away team
| Away team score
| Venue
| Date
|- bgcolor="#FFFFFF"
| 
| 14.12 (96)
| 
| 6.10 (46)
| Victoria Park
| 13 August 1904
|- bgcolor="#FFFFFF"
| 
| 11.10 (76)
| 
| 6.4 (40)
| MCG
| 13 August 1904
|- bgcolor="#FFFFFF"
| 
| 5.16 (46)
| 
| 8.10 (58)
| Lake Oval
| 13 August 1904
|- bgcolor="#FFFFFF"
| 
| 5.5 (35)
| 
| 5.9 (39)
| EMCG
| 13 August 1904

Sectional Rounds

Sectional Round 1 (Round 15)

|- bgcolor="#CCCCFF"
| Home team
| Home team score
| Away team
| Away team score
| Venue
| Date
|- bgcolor="#FFFFFF"
| 
| 14.12 (96)
| 
| 6.10 (46)
| Victoria Park
| 20 August 1904
|- bgcolor="#FFFFFF"
| 
| 8.9 (57)
| 
| 5.9 (39)
| EMCG
| 20 August 1904
|- bgcolor="#FFFFFF"
| 
| 4.14 (38)
| 
| 3.15 (33)
| Brunswick Street Oval
| 20 August 1904
|- bgcolor="#FFFFFF"
| 
| 13.15 (93)
| 
| 3.3 (21)
| MCG
| 20 August 1904

Sectional Round 2 (Round 16)

|- bgcolor="#CCCCFF"
| Home team
| Home team score
| Away team
| Away team score
| Venue
| Date
|- bgcolor="#FFFFFF"
| 
| 1.8 (14)
| 
| 5.13 (43)
| Princes Park
| 27 August 1904
|- bgcolor="#FFFFFF"
| 
| 2.8 (20)
| 
| 12.9 (81)
| Junction Oval
| 27 August 1904
|- bgcolor="#FFFFFF"
| 
| 4.3 (27)
| 
| 8.11 (59)
| Lake Oval
| 27 August 1904
|- bgcolor="#FFFFFF"
| 
| 4.6 (30)
| 
| 8.5 (53)
| Corio Oval
| 27 August 1904

Sectional Round 3 (Round 17)

|- bgcolor="#CCCCFF"
| Home team
| Home team score
| Away team
| Away team score
| Venue
| Date
|- bgcolor="#FFFFFF"
| 
| 16.11 (107)
| 
| 7.7 (49)
| Princes Park
| 3 September 1904
|- bgcolor="#FFFFFF"
| 
| 5.10 (40)
| 
| 7.9 (51)
| MCG
| 3 September 1904
|- bgcolor="#FFFFFF"
| 
| 13.9 (87)
| 
| 4.2 (26)
| EMCG
| 3 September 1904
|- bgcolor="#FFFFFF"
| 
| 3.4 (22)
| 
| 6.8 (44)
| Corio Oval
| 3 September 1904

Ladder

Semi finals

First Semi Final

|- bgcolor="#CCCCFF"
| Home team
| Home team score
| Away team
| Away team score
| Venue
| Date
| Attendance
|- bgcolor="#FFFFFF"
| 
| 6.7 (43)
| 
| 6.4 (40)
| Victoria Park
| 10 September 1904
| 16,000
|- bgcolor="#FFFFFF"

Second Semi Final

|- bgcolor="#CCCCFF"
| Home team
| Home team score
| Away team
| Away team score
| Venue
| Date
| Attendance
|- bgcolor="#FFFFFF"
| 
| 9.7 (61)
| 
| 7.8 (50)
| MCG
| 10 September 1904
| 25,000
|- bgcolor="#FFFFFF"

Grand final

Fitzroy defeated Carlton 9.7 (61) to 5.7 (37). (For an explanation of scoring see Australian rules football).

Awards
 The 1904 VFL Premiership team was Fitzroy.
 The VFL's leading goalkicker was Vince Coutie of Melbourne with 39 goals.
 St Kilda took the "wooden spoon" in 1904.

Notable events
 The final home-and-away match between South Melbourne and Fitzroy at the Lake Oval was a torrid affair. Billy McGee of South Melbourne and Harry Clarke of Fitzroy were each suspended for three matches, while South Melbourne's Billy Gent ran amok during the match, charging at players and was reported on three striking charges; Gent was suspended for the remainder of 1904 and all of 1905 (20 matches).
 After the drawn match between Geelong and Carlton at Corio Oval on 9 July 1904, a spectator is arrested for attacking the field umpire, Henry "Ivo" Crapp.
 The VFL introduces boundary umpires.
 In round four, Essendon plays Melbourne in Sydney in front of only 6,000 spectators at the Sydney Cricket Ground, loses to Melbourne, takes five days to return to Melbourne by sea, then loses again to Fitzroy in their Saturday's round five match.
 In the Final Premiership match Carlton was surging ahead of Fitzroy, and one of the Carlton forwards (Ross, 1996, does not name him, but it was most likely Mick Grace) took a powerful high overhead mark with his knees in his opponent's back. The field umpire, Henry "Ivo" Crapp, obeying the VFL rules of the day, paid a free kick to the Fitzroy player for "interference". Fitzroy steadied and went on to win the game. There was such an outcry after the match that the VFL immediately amended its rules to allow for what it now termed "unintentional interference".

References
 Maplestone, M., Flying Higher: History of the Essendon Football Club 1872–1996, Essendon Football Club, (Melbourne), 1996. 
 Rogers, S. & Brown, A., Every Game Ever Played: VFL/AFL Results 1897–1997 (Sixth Edition), Viking Books, (Ringwood), 1998. 
 Ross, J. (ed), 100 Years of Australian Football 1897–1996: The Complete Story of the AFL, All the Big Stories, All the Great Pictures, All the Champions, Every AFL Season Reported, Viking, (Ringwood), 1996.

External links
 1904 Season - AFL Tables

Australian Football League seasons